Hasanpur is a city and a municipality in Amroha district of Uttar Pradesh, India. The city is around 120 kilometeres from the national capital Delhi and 12 km from the NH-24. Hasanpur is known for its diversity and communal harmony. The town consists of a Kotwali (Police Stationj), a Community Health Center(Govt. Hospital) and many banks.

History
Hasanpur is named after a Pathan ruler named Hasan Khan, also called Mubarak Khan, who drove out the previous Goshain rulers and gained control of the town in 1634. The Pathans remained the primary zamindars until the 20th century, although at the turn of the century the most important Pathan family was the Nimwala family, who were of more recent origin than the original founders. The Nimwalas traced their ancestry three or four generations back to one Bahadur Ali Khan.

During the late 1800s, Hasanpur grew in importance as a trade centre, and some Banias became fairly wealthy, and its population increased from 8,082 in 1847 to 9,579 in 1901. At that time its population was about 50% Muslim and 50% Hindu. The neighboring settlement of Mubarakpur was incorporated into Hasanpur in 1877. In the early 20th century the main industry was cotton cloth. There was a police station, a dispensary, a sarai, a cattle pound, and a post office, along with one middle school, one primary school, and one girls' school. There were also two private schools, one teaching Arabic and the other teaching Sanskrit. The Arabic school was run by one Haji Ahmad Husain Khan

Demographics
 India census, Hasanpur had a population of 211,533 of which males constituted 57% of the population and females 43%. Hasanpur has an average literacy rate of 43% which is lower than the national average of 59.5%. The male literacy is 49% and female literacy rate is 37%. In Hasanpur, 18% of the population is under the age of 6.

References

Cities and towns in Amroha district